Ballesteros is a Spanish surname. Notable people with the surname include:

Alejandro Ballestero, Spanish politician
Ángel Ballesteros Gallardo, Spanish poet and historian
Camilo Ballesteros, Chilean politician
Carolina Rodriguez Ballesteros, Spanish rhythmic gymnast
Chasty Ballesteros, Canadian actress
Elena Ballesteros, Spanish actress
Enrique Ballesteros (1905-1969), Uruguayan footballer
Estong Ballesteros, Filipino basketball player
Francisca Ballesteros, Spanish murderer
Francisco Ballesteros (1770–1832), Spanish general
Héctor Ballesteros, Colombian weightlifter
Hugo Ballesteros Reyes (1931-2019), Chilean politician
Humberto Ballesteros, Argentine goalkeeper
Irma Sandoval-Ballesteros, Mexican academic
Jason Ballesteros, Filipino basketball player
Javier Ballesteros, Spanish footballer
Jesús Ballesteros, Spanish philosopher and jurist
Jorge Ballesteros, Spanish sport shooter
Jorge Eduardo Ballesteros, Mexican skier
Juan Matta-Ballesteros, Honduran drug trafficker
María Ballesteros, Mexican swimmer
Miguel Jerónimo de Ballesteros (died 1555), Roman Catholic bishop
Paolo Ballesteros, Filipino actor
Pío Ballesteros (1919-1995), Spanish writer, producer and director
Rafael Ballesteros (born 1938), Spanish poet
Roberto Ballesteros, Peruvian actor
Seve Ballesteros (1957–2011), Spanish golfer
Sergio Martínez Ballesteros Spanish footballer

Spanish-language surnames